Prinzenstraße is a Berlin U-Bahn station on lines U1 and U3.

Overview
It is located roughly where the eponymous street crosses the Landwehrkanal in Kreuzberg. The nearby Böcklerpark, a small park with a hall where music events are often held, and the Sommerbad Kreuzberg swimming pool, colloquially called Prinzenbad, are among the most popular venues in central Kreuzberg. The street and subsequently the station were named after Prince William I, the later German Emperor.

The station on the first U-Bahn line from Potsdamer Platz to Stralauer Tor was opened on 18 February 1902. Because the station is on a viaduct above the junction of Prinzenstraße and Gitschiner Straße, a street level entrance hall could only be erected on its south side on the grounds of a gas plant, while the stairs to the northern platform had to be included in the opposite residential building.

Destroyed in World War II on 28/29 January 1944 and 3 February 1945, the station was rebuilt in the 1950s. It later received new entrance halls in a hotly disputed Postmodern style, in 1984 for the north wing and 1991 for the south wing. Inside, a preserved detail of the old station is found at the northern platform, a small sculpture of a frog with a crown and a ball, alluding to the Frog Prince fairy tale.

References

U1 (Berlin U-Bahn) stations
U3 (Berlin U-Bahn) stations
Buildings and structures in Friedrichshain-Kreuzberg
Railway stations in Germany opened in 1902